Craugastor palenque is a species of frogs in the family Craugastoridae.

It is found in Guatemala and Mexico.
Its natural habitats are subtropical or tropical moist lowland forests and rivers.
It is threatened by habitat loss.

References

 

palenque
Amphibians described in 2000
Taxonomy articles created by Polbot